This is a list of contestants who have appeared on the television series, The Amazing Race, previously known as The Amazing Race en Discovery Channel. Contestants with a pre-existing relationship form a team and race across Latin America against other teams to claim a grand prize of US$250,000. In total, 110 contestants have appeared in the series.

Contestants
The presented information was accurate at the time of filming.

1 Originally from Chile.
2 Originally from the United States.

See also
 List of The Amazing Race (Latin America) winners

References
Official Site (Discovery) 
Official Site (Space) 

Amazing Race (Latin America) contestants, The
Reality television articles with incorrect naming style